Helen Hart may refer to:
Helen Hart (author), writer of children's books
Helen Hart (plant pathologist) (1900–1971), American  plant pathologist
Helen Hart (wrestling) (1924–2001), née Smith, matriarch of the Hart wrestling family
Helen Hart, née Cooper, a character from the soap opera Family Affairs